Red Mill may refer to:

Red Mill (snack food manufacturer), a British manufacturer
Bob's Red Mill, an American food brand
The Red Mill, a Broadway operetta which premiered in 1906
The Red Mill (film), a 1927 American adaptation of the operetta
Red Mill, New Jersey, United States, an unincorporated community
Red Mill Burgers, a restaurant in Seattle, Washington, United States
Red Mill Farm, an historic farming district in New York, United States
Red Mill Commons, a shopping center in Virginia, United States
Red Mills Trial Hurdle, a race held in Ireland
Red Mill (Clinton, New Jersey), United States, a grist mill and historic site
Red Mill Museum Village, open-air museum including Clinton's Red Mill
Reedham Ferry Drainage Mill or Red Mill, a former drainage mill in Norfolk, England, now a privately owned holiday home